George Warren Weymouth (August 25, 1850 – September 7, 1910) was a U.S. Representative from Massachusetts.

Early life

Born in West Amesbury (now Merrimac), Massachusetts, Weymouth attended the public schools and the Merrimac High School. He moved to Fitchburg in 1882 and engaged in the carriage business. He later became manager of the Simonds Rolling Machine Co.

Career
Weymouth was trustee of the Fitchburg Savings Bank from 1891 to 1901 and director of the Fitchburg National Bank from 1892 to 1901. He was also a director in other corporations. He served as member of the common council of Fitchburg in 1886 and in the Massachusetts House of Representatives in 1896. He served as delegate to the Republican National Convention in 1896.

Weymouth was elected as a Republican to the Fifty-fifth and Fifty-sixth Congresses (March 4, 1897 – March 3, 1901). He was not a candidate for renomination in 1900.

Later life and death
Following his time in Washington, he moved to Fairhaven, Massachusetts, where he served as president of the Atlas Tack Corp. from 1897 to 1910. Weymouth died in an automobile accident near Bingham, Maine, on September 7, 1910. He was interred in Riverside Cemetery in Fairhaven.

References

1850 births
1910 deaths
Republican Party members of the Massachusetts House of Representatives
People from Merrimac, Massachusetts
Road incident deaths in Maine
Republican Party members of the United States House of Representatives from Massachusetts
People from Fairhaven, Massachusetts
19th-century American politicians